House of Gucci is a 2021 American biographical crime drama film directed by Ridley Scott, based on the 2001 book The House of Gucci: A Sensational Story of Murder, Madness, Glamour, and Greed by Sara Gay Forden. The film follows Patrizia Reggiani (Lady Gaga) and Maurizio Gucci (Adam Driver), as their romance transforms into a fight for control of the Italian fashion brand Gucci. Jared Leto, Jeremy Irons, Jack Huston, Salma Hayek, and Al Pacino also star.

Scott wanted to make a film about the Gucci dynasty after acquiring rights to Forden's book in the early 2000s. The project languished for several years, with a number of directors and rumored actors being considered before Scott and Gaga became officially attached in November 2019. Much of the remaining cast joined the following summer, and filming began in Italy, lasting from February through May 2021.

The world premiere of House of Gucci was held at the Odeon Luxe Leicester Square in London on November 9, 2021. It was theatrically released by United Artists Releasing in the United States on November 24, 2021. The film received mixed reviews from critics who praised the cast's performances, but criticized the inconsistent tone and editing. Gaga and Leto were nominated for the Screen Actors Guild Award, Critics' Choice Award, and Satellite Award for Best Actress and Best Supporting Actor, respectively, while the former also received nominations for the Golden Globe Award and BAFTA Award. The film earned a nomination at the 94th Academy Awards for Best Makeup and Hairstyling. It has grossed over $153 million against a $75 million budget.

Plot
In 1978, Patrizia Reggiani is the office manager of her father's small trucking firm. At a party in the early 80s, she meets Maurizio Gucci, a law student and heir to a 50% interest in the Gucci fashion house through his father Rodolfo. Patrizia aggressively pursues the awkward Maurizio, charming him into love. 

Rodolfo warns Maurizio that Patrizia is only after wealth and tells him he will disinherit him if he marries Patrizia; Maurizio chooses her over his connection to Gucci, leaving the family. Patrizia and Maurizio marry, and he gets a job at the trucking company. 

When Patrizia becomes pregnant, she sees her child as an avenue for familial reconciliation. She lets it slip to Maurizio's uncle Aldo that she is pregnant; he is delighted by the news and takes the couple under his wing. 

Aldo introduces Patrizia to his eccentric son Paolo, who aspires to be a designer within Gucci despite his lack of talent. Aldo helps Maurizio and a terminally ill Rodolfo reconcile shortly before the latter's death. Rodolfo writes Maurizio back into his will, but fails to sign a document transferring the Gucci shares to him before he dies. Patrizia forges Rodolfo's signature, giving Maurizio a 50% interest in Gucci.

Patrizia devises a plot to obtain controlling interest in Gucci by acquiring some of Aldo and Paolo's shares (they hold the other 50% interest). She clashes with Aldo over the firm's clandestine sale of cheap "fake" Gucci products on the black market, and begins to consult Giuseppina "Pina", a psychic, for guidance. She manipulates Maurizio, who has little real interest in Gucci, into taking a more active role within the company. 

Paolo acquires proof that Aldo has been evading taxes in the United States; he gives this to Patrizia in exchange for her promise that he will be allowed to design his own line. Aldo is arrested by the IRS and sentenced to a year and a day in prison. 

Patrizia lies to the Italian police and tells them that Paolo is not authorized to use the Gucci trademark, so they stop his fashion show by force. Patrizia and Maurizio ask Paolo to sell them his shares, but he rebuffs and cuts ties with them.

Italian police search Maurizio's, attempting to arrest him for forging Rodolfo's signature. His family flees to Switzerland, where Maurizio meets his old friend Paola Franchi. After an argument between Maurizio and Patrizia, he decides he is tired of his wife's influence on himself and the company. He orders his wife and daughter to return to Italy and begins an affair with Paola, which Pina seemingly senses. 

When Maurizio's business plans harm the company, he seeks assistance from equity company Investcorp, through which he hatches a scheme to acquire shares of the company from a now-impoverished Paolo. Aldo returns from prison and immediately realizes what Paolo has done. When Investcorp offers to buy Aldo out, he refuses until Maurizio reveals himself as the deal's instigator. Dejected, Aldo sells the shares and cuts contact with Maurizio.

Patrizia attempts a reconciliation with Maurizio, but he flatly ignores her. Later, he asks her for a divorce through his long-time assistant Domenico De Sole, which she refuses. Maurizio recruits up-and-coming designer Tom Ford to revitalize the company's image through a new line. His products are successful, but Maurizio has so thoroughly mismanaged the company that, by 1995, Investcorp's leaders feel compelled to buy him out, replacing him with Tom and Domenico. 

Patrizia eventually grows so furious with Maurizio that she asks Pina to help her assassinate him. She puts her in contact with two hitmen. A few days later, they shoot Maurizio to death in broad daylight outside his office.

Closing intertitles describe the fate of the remaining characters: Aldo died of prostate cancer in 1990 and Paolo died in poverty shortly following the sale of their shares to Maurizio. Patrizia, Pina, and the hitmen are sentenced to long prison terms following their arrest for murder. Gucci is fully acquired by Investcorp and successfully managed into the present; no Gucci family members remain at the company. 

In the final scene, Patrizia takes her husband's last name while announcing herself in court, indicating that she still considers herself to be a Gucci even if the law does not.

Cast

Production

Development 

In June 2006, Ridley Scott was set to direct a film about the downfall of the Gucci family dynasty, with Andrea Berloff writing the script, despite the family's dismissal of the project, with Angelina Jolie and Leonardo DiCaprio rumored to play Patrizia Reggiani and Maurizio Gucci. In February 2012, Scott's daughter Jordan Scott had replaced him as director and was in talks with Penélope Cruz to play Reggiani. In November 2016, Wong Kar-wai took over as director from Jordan Scott, with Charles Randolph writing alongside Berloff and Margot Robbie now considered to play Reggiani. In November 2019, Ridley Scott was once again set to direct the film, with Roberto Bentivegna writing the script, and Lady Gaga set to star. According to the Gucci CEO, Marco Bizzarri, the fashion house cooperated with the production and gave them full access to their archives for wardrobe and props.

Gaga explained that she took into account how her long-time friend Tony Bennett "feels about Italians being represented in film in terms of crime", and aspired to "make a real person out of Patrizia, not a caricature." To achieve that, she studied Reggiani's vocal cadence and attitude. She explained: "I felt the best way to honor Maurizio and Italians was for my performance to be authentic, from the perspective of a woman. Not an Italian-American woman but an Italian woman." She stayed in character for 18 months, speaking with an accent for nine months during that period. She also adlibbed many of her lines, including the film's iconic quote "Father, Son and House of Gucci," which went viral after the release of the film's first trailer.

Casting 

In November 2019, it was announced that Gaga would play Reggiani. In April 2020, Metro-Goldwyn-Mayer acquired the rights to the film. By August, Adam Driver, Jared Leto, Al Pacino, Robert De Niro, Jack Huston and Reeve Carney had entered negotiations to join the cast. Driver, Leto, Pacino and De Niro were confirmed by October. Huston and Carney were confirmed in December along with Jeremy Irons, while De Niro had exited the film. Dariusz Wolski announced his involvement as cinematographer that same month. Camille Cottin joined the cast in January 2021. In March, Mădălina Diana Ghenea, Mehdi Nebbou, and Miloud Mourad Benamara were added to the cast, along with Salma Hayek, who is married to the CEO of Gucci's parent company, François-Henri Pinault.

Filming 
In August 2020, it was reported that the filming was expected to begin when Scott completed production of The Last Duel (2021). On February 3, 2021, Leto said that the film was still in the pre-production phase and they would start shooting it in Italy in the coming weeks. Principal photography began in Rome at the end of February, with COVID-19 safety precautions in place. Several scenes were filmed in early March in the cities of Gressoney-Saint-Jean and Gressoney-La-Trinité, specifically in the Italian Alps in the Aosta Valley, which were used to recreate the tourist complex of St. Moritz in Switzerland. Filming also took place in other locations in the country such as Florence, Lake Como (at Villa del Balbiano), and Milan, including the Villa Necchi-Campiglio (previously featured in the film I Am Love). At the end of March, they returned to Rome to shoot scenes at Via Condotti. Filming wrapped on May 8.

Release and marketing
House of Gucci had its world premiere at the Odeon Luxe Leicester Square in London on November 9, 2021. It was released theatrically in North America on November 24, 2021, and in the United Kingdom on November 26. Following its theatrical release, it will also be available to stream on Paramount+.

United Artists Releasing aired the first trailer for the film during the 2021 Summer Olympics. Social media accounts promoting the film on Twitter, Instagram, YouTube, and Facebook had a total of 415.4 million followers, including 234 million followers from the cast. Overall, the marketing campaign delivered at least 1.2 billion impressions and 407 million views online. Marketing tactics included radio, social, and ticketing partnerships, television spots, and promotions on TikTok, Twitter, and Snapchat. Crime podcasts were used to attract younger audiences. In theaters, trailers for the film ran during screenings of Respect, Reminiscence, Dear Evan Hansen, Venom: Let There Be Carnage, No Time to Die, Halloween Kills, The Last Duel, Eternals and King Richard. By November 25, United Artists Releasing had spent $12.8 million on television advertisements promoting the film.

Home media
House of Gucci became available for streaming on February 1, 2022. It was released on Blu-ray and DVD on February 22.

Reception

Box office 
House of Gucci grossed $53.8 million in the United States and Canada, and $99.5 million in other territories, for a worldwide total of $153.3 million.

In the United States and Canada, House of Gucci was released alongside Encanto and Resident Evil: Welcome to Raccoon City, and was originally projected to gross $15–20 million from 3,441 theaters in its five-day opening weekend. The film opened nationwide on Wednesday, November 24, 2021, and made $4.2 million on its first day—including $1.3 million from Tuesday night previews—from a total of 345,000 theater admissions. House of Gucci went on to debut to a $22 million five-day opening. The main reasons given for seeing the film were Lady Gaga (40%), the ensemble cast (32%), and the plot (34%). Audiences were 45% between the ages of 18 and 34, and 34% over the age of 45, a higher-than-average result for a drama film targeting an older audience during the COVID-19 pandemic. According to Deadline Hollywood, House of Gucci had the best box office opening for a drama film since Little Women in 2019, and Forbes predicted that the film would become "by far, the most 'successful' adult-skewing non-action drama of the so-called pandemic era." The film made $7 million in its second weekend, $4.1 million in its third, $1.99 million in its fourth, and $915,339 in its fifth. In its seventh weekend, the film crossed the $50 million mark in the U.S. and Canada while also finishing tenth at the box office with $616,744.

Outside the U.S. and Canada, the film earned $12.8 million from 40 markets in its opening weekend; the top countries in its first five days were the U.K. ($3.4 million), France ($1.9 million), Mexico ($975,000), Spain ($795,000), and the Netherlands ($629,000). The film went on to make $14.8 million in its second weekend and $10.1 million in its third. In its fourth weekend, House of Gucci grossed $4.1 million and crossed the $100 million mark worldwide. The film earned $3.16 million in its sixth weekend, $4 million in its seventh, $4.4 million in its eighth, and $2.8 million in its ninth.

Critical response 
The website's consensus reads, "House of Gucci vacillates between inspired camp and dour drama too often to pull off a confident runway strut, but Lady Gaga's note-perfect performance has a timeless style all its own." Metacritic, which uses a weighted average, assigned the film a score of 59 out of 100 based on 57 critics, indicating mixed or average reviews. Audiences polled by CinemaScore gave the film an average grade of "B+" on an A+ to F scale, while those at PostTrak gave it an 82% positive score, with 60% saying they would definitely recommend it. Deadline Hollywood noted a strong divide between critics and audiences and said, "it appears moviegoers are overpowering." Screen Rant commented that although the film received mixed reviews from critics, the performances of the cast were highly praised, with particular emphasis on Lady Gaga and Jared Leto.

Alissa Wilkinson of Vox gave the film a mixed review, praising the performances but criticizing the screenplay and writing: "The movie the trailer is selling is actually a little more dishy and wild than the real House of Gucci, which would be a pointless and somewhat perfunctory dud if it weren't for the brilliance, or madness, of the performances." Reviewing the film for The Hollywood Reporter, David Rooney wrote: "Ridley Scott's film is a trashtacular watch that I wouldn't have missed for the world. But it fails to settle on a consistent tone — overlong and undisciplined as it careens between high drama and opera buffa."

Richard Roeper of the Chicago Sun-Times gave the film two and a half out of four stars, writing: "Adam Driver (who has now played a French squire and an Italian fashion heir in consecutive Ridley Scott movies) and Lady Gaga have legit chemistry together, and it's still a kick to see Al Pacino roaring like a lion in winter. But Hayek and Irons are playing cardboard-thin characters, Leto flounders about as if he's in a movie all his own, and House of Gucci feels coldly calculating when it should have been flush and warm with scandalous sensationalism." Writing for The New York Times, A. O. Scott found the film to be a missed opportunity that could've been crafted more in line with better cinematic standards, stating that it lacks "the necessary vision or inspiration."

Gaga's Italian accent was met with criticism by Italian actress and dialect coach Francesca De Martini, who worked on set as a dialogue coach for Hayek, and claimed that Gaga's "accent is not exactly an Italian accent, it sounds more Russian." BBC stated that Leto's portrayal of Paolo Gucci inspired "both ridicule and irritation." Film critic Mark Kermode described his performance as "parodic", writing that "while others adopt faintly ridiculous Italian inflections, Leto delivers his lines in a string of high-pitched whoops that suggest he is attempting to communicate with whales." David Ehrlich of IndieWire described Leto as "brilliantly over-the-top".

Responding to negative reviews characterizing the cast's performances as "high-flown and jarringly incongruous," Michael Shindler of The American Conservative wrote that such comments overlook those performances' relation to the film's "dramatic substance," "a conflict of high-flown and jarringly incongruous personalities vying to remake Gucci in their own image," arguing in that vein that the film, like Scott's All the Money in the World, is a historical drama about the emergence of "a new man whose very character is adapted to the demands of contemporary commerce," comparing J. Paul Getty's role in the latter to that of Tom Ford.

Response from involved parties 

In January 2021, during an interview with Italian magazine Novella 2000, Patrizia Reggiani approved that Gaga would portray her and commented she "immensely" likes her, saying "she's a genius". However, in March, Reggiani gave an interview to the Agenzia Nazionale Stampa Associata (ANSA) where she stated she was "annoyed" that Gaga had not contacted her to meet her and claimed that "it is not an economic question. I won't get a cent from the film. It is a question of good sense and respect". Later that month, it was confirmed that the producers did not want Gaga to meet her and they were "aware of not wanting to endorse or support the awful crime" she committed, saying Gaga had watched much footage and many documentaries, and read books about her life. Gaga also stated that she has no interest in "colluding" with Reggiani, but her heart goes "out to her daughters... I do care deeply that this must be very painful for them."

Patrizia Gucci, who is Paolo Gucci's daughter and Maurizio Gucci's first cousin once removed, told the Associated Press, in the name of the Gucci family, they were "truly disappointed" by the film. "They are stealing the identity of a family to make a profit, to increase the income of the Hollywood system." She added, "Our family has an identity, privacy. We can talk about everything, but there is a borderline that cannot be crossed". According to Gucci, the three central concerns of the family are inaccuracies in the film, the lack of contact with Ridley Scott, and the casting of high-profile actors to play people who were not connected with the murder. She also said that the Gucci family will decide what their next course of action will be after watching the completed film. Scott rejected her claims, saying that "You have to remember that one Gucci was murdered and another went to jail for tax evasion so you can't be talking to me about making a profit. As soon as you do that you become part of the public domain."

Tom Ford, in an article for Air Mail, stated that he "felt as though [he] had lived through a hurricane when [he] left the theater," saying that, despite laughing on a few occasions, he found it "hard for [him] to see the humor and camp in something that was so bloody. In real life, none of it was camp. It was at times absurd, but ultimately it was tragic". Ford praised most of the cast, though he did criticize Pacino's and Leto's performances, comparing them to Saturday Night Live performers and adding on the latter, "Leto's brilliance as an actor is literally buried under latex prosthetics... Paolo, whom I met on several occasions, was indeed eccentric and did some wacky things, but his overall demeanor was certainly not like the crazed and seemingly mentally challenged character of Leto's performance". While not directly commenting on his role in the film or Reeve Carney's portrayal of him, Ford noted that the moment of Maurizio toasting him was inaccurate, as he had already been bought out by the company before Ford became Gucci's creative director.

Accolades

References

External links
 
Official screenplay
 
 

2021 films
2021 biographical drama films
2021 crime drama films
American biographical drama films
American crime drama films
Bron Studios films
Crime films based on actual events
Drama films based on actual events
2020s English-language films
Films about companies
Films about dysfunctional families
Films about fashion designers
Films about murder
Films based on non-fiction books
Films directed by Ridley Scott
Films impacted by the COVID-19 pandemic
Films scored by Harry Gregson-Williams
Films set in the 1970s
Films set in the 1980s
Films set in the 1990s
Films set in 1995
Films set in Italy
Films set in Milan
Films set in New York City
Films set in Switzerland
Films shot in Aosta Valley
Films shot in Florence
Films shot in Lombardy
Films shot in Milan
Films shot in Rome
Golden Raspberry Award winning films
Gucci
Metro-Goldwyn-Mayer films
Scott Free Productions films
Universal Pictures films
2020s American films
2021 in fashion